Helen Claire Frost went missing on October 13, 1970, four days before her 18th birthday, after telling her sister Sandy that she was going for a walk. She had recently broken up with her boyfriend, and had given up her firstborn child for adoption earlier that year. Frost left her apartment on the 1600 block of Queensway in Prince George, British Columbia and has not been seen since.

Background 
Helen Frost was born in Reigate, England on October 17, 1952 to parents Dennis and Daphne Frost. She had an older sister named Sandy. Her father was a green beret in the British Commando Brigade for 12 years, and worked on the docks in London during World War II. In 1956, the family moved to Nanaimo, British Columbia, Canada. After the move, Dennis worked for the city of Nanaimo as a sweeper operator. Helen's family was stable and her mother and father were married for 67 years, until Dennis died on July 20, 2014. Sandy described them as "good parents despite the head-strong actions of their two rebellious teenage girls."

Helen moved to Prince George, British Columbia in 1969, and Sandy joined her in November of that year. They shared an apartment on the 1600 block of Queensway, along with a woman named Darlene and her infant child. In the spring of 1970, Helen went to a home for unwed mothers in Kamloops where she gave birth to a daughter, Sandra Jeanette, on May 13 of that year. Shortly afterwards, she returned to Prince George and her baby was taken into government custody. She unsuccessfully tried to regain custody of the baby in the summer of 1970. Sandy recalled that Helen came out of the social worker's office, "just bawling her eyes out, and we never talked about it again." Sometime between the birth of her child and her disappearance, Helen's relationship with the father of the child, Stefan Grumpner, dissolved.

Helen worked a number of odd jobs while she was in Prince George, including a busser at the Hudson's Bay Company cafeteria, and a gas station painter for a company that operated between Prince George and Prince Rupert.

Personality 
Helen was considered an introvert and was described as a private person. Despite this, Helen had a spontaneous side as demonstrated by her job-seeking adventures. In the summer of 1967 (when Sandy was 15 and Helen was 14) the sisters went to Abbotsford to work as berry pickers. The following summer, they went to Penticton and spent most of their time hitchhiking and sleeping outside after the jobs they had been promised didn't materialize. The girls were often picked up by truckers who would sometimes buy them a meal and radio ahead for another truck to take them on the next leg of their journey. Helen was comfortable with such high-risk behavior.

Relationship status 
Helen was single at the time of her disappearance. She had given birth to her daughter, Sandra Jeanette, on May 13, 1970 in Kamloops and moved to Prince George shortly afterwards. The father of this child was identified as Stefan Grumpner, who left Helen shortly after the birth. It is not public knowledge when Stefan and Helen separated. The police interviewed Stefan after Helen's disappearance and reported that they did not find anything suspicious.

Identifying characteristics 
Helen was a Caucasian female with blue eyes and brown-blonde hair. She stood about 5 feet 5 inches and weighed about 125 pounds. Since birth, Helen's right eye drooped, appearing slightly closed as compared to her left eye. She had given birth six months prior to her disappearance.

Personal items at time of disappearance 
When she disappeared, Helen was wearing a three-quarter length, navy-blue nylon coat with a fake fur-trimmed hood and blue pants. Sandy reported that Helen left behind money, clothes, and identification at their apartment.

Disappearance 
Helen was last seen Tuesday, October 13, 1970, four days before her 18th birthday  on the 1600 block of Queensway, Prince George where she shared an apartment with her sister Sandy, along with a woman named Darlene and her infant child. Sandy reported that she came home at about 8:00 pm after coffee with a friend, and met Helen. Helen asked Sandy if she wanted to go for a walk but Sandy declined because it was too cold. Helen said she would go out for a quick walk by herself, left at about 8:20 pm, and never returned home.

Helen was not immediately reported missing because Sandy thought that she might be over at a friend's house. When she didn't return by Thursday, October 15, two days later, Sandy reported her disappearance to the Royal Canadian Mounted Police (RCMP).

Investigation 
Helen was reported missing by her sister Sandy on October 15, 1970. Sandy said that the RCMP took a missing person's report, but she got the impression that nothing was done. Sandy lamented that she was too young and inexperienced at the time to push for more action from the RCMP. There was a tip that Helen had hitchhiked from the Husky gas station in Prince George. Although the RCMP investigated this tip, they could not substantiate it.

The RCMP does not have a statute of limitations on serious cases, and Helen's case is still active. There have been a number of officers assigned to the case since 1970, with the most recent having been assigned in 2017 (file 1970 - 70118).

Search effort 
Sandy and a friend conducted an independent search for Helen. Sandy's friend determined that a truck driver saw Helen hitchhiking from the Husky gas station in Prince George, but the RCMP were unable to verify this tip.

Sandy has been the main driving force behind the search for Helen, with the assistance of some friends. In 2018, Helen's daughter, Sandra Jeannette Frost, now named Michelle Johnson, reached out to Sandy after searching for her birth mother. Michelle and Sandy were reunited later on that year.

Awareness effort 
The awareness effort for Helen's disappearance includes missing person posters, news articles, and a Facebook page dedicated to her disappearance. Sandy pushed to get Helen's name added to the E-Pana list of victims in the hopes of raising more awareness for Helen's disappearance, but the RCMP declined the request, citing that the case did not meet the criteria for inclusion. However, this is in contradiction with the criteria for inclusion. There are many cases like Helen's that meet what the RCMP reports as the criteria for inclusion; however, there have been no more victims added to the E-Pana list since it reached a total of 18 in 2007.

In 2009, Sandy reported that her father told her "I really hope I know what happened before I die." Dennis died on July 20, 2014, without discovering what had happened to his daughter.

Theories 
Three main theories exist as to how Helen Claire Frost disappeared, including: accident, runaway, suicide.

Accident 
There is no evidence that she did or did not have an accident that caused her to lose contact with her friends and relatives. No remains were ever found and identified as Helen's, no sign of an accident has ever been indicated to the public, nor is it public knowledge if any witnesses have come forward to report an accident. There is no public evidence indicating that she ever had an accident.

Runaway 
Helen was known to have run away in the past. However, Sandy said that there were indications that this was not the case because Helen had left behind money, clothes, and identification at the apartment, which they shared.

Suicide 
Helen was going through a number of difficult challenges around the time of her disappearance. She had experienced giving up a child, the end of a romantic relationship, and a taxing living situation, living with a newborn child after having to give up her own baby. Because of these circumstances, it is plausible that she was under a great deal of stress. However, Sandy stated publicly that there was no evidence that Helen took her own life, and there was no suicide note left behind.

New London County Jane Doe 
New London County Jane Doe was a woman whose remains were found in a shallow grave, wrapped in a blanket, on May 30, 1974 in New London County, Connecticut in the United States. It has been proposed that she is Helen Frost. The remains were found in a wooded area behind a house on Shewville Road. To this day the jurisdiction is disputed between Stonington and Ledyard CT police departments. The Connecticut State Police are now handling the investigation. The remains were completely skeletonized by the time that she was found. It was surmised that Jane Doe died alongside bank robber Gustavous Lee Carmichael, the man she was last seen with and who was thought to be her boyfriend, on December 31, 1970. This date fits within Frost's plausible timeline since she disappeared on October 13, 1970.

This particular Jane Doe went by the alias Lorraine Stahl. It was determined that Jane Doe was murdered and her remains were buried beside Carmichael's. Richard DeFreitas and Donald Brant were ultimately convicted of the murders. Their motive was concern that the unidentified woman (Lorraine Stahl) would divulge details of Carmichael's illegal activities. Jane Doe was known to have made phone calls in the months leading up to her death. All the known calls were to states on the eastern seaboard. Jane Doe was also known to drive in a 1964 green Oldsmobile with either Massachusetts or Maine plates. The vehicle was found dumped in Hartford, Connecticut with a Maine inspection sticker.

The composite sketch (based on the recollections of people who interacted with her rather than a reconstruction), in addition to some of her estimated body characteristics, bore a resemblance to Frost. Doe was described as being 18–30 years old with reddish brown hair; Frost was 18 with brown-blonde hair. Doe was estimated at about five foot 2 and between 110 and 115 pounds. Some newspaper accounts from the time list Jane Doe up to 5'8" tall.  Frost was five foot five and between 100 and 125 pounds. Jane Doe's dental records included no maxilla due to a gunshot wound. The distinguishing characteristics are that #30 has two separate occlusal amalgams while #17 is mesially inclined. Frost's dental records are not public knowledge.

Jane Doe's remains were found with a number of items, none of which were the items with which Frost had last been seen. Jane Doe's items included a ring with an almond-shaped design with the stylized inscription JHSN and 1917. The almond-shaped design bears some resemblance to the modern alumni ring for Johns Hopkins School of Nursing, which also has an almond-shaped design. Other items associated to Doe included a Lady Clairol hair roller set, a tan leather "wet look" vest, a gold/tan sweater, a brown tweed skirt, brown granny boots that go to the knees, and a yellow raincoat.

In July 2018, Internet sleuth Joseph Calash of Oakdale, CT reported the potential match to The Connecticut Medical Examiner as well as The Royal Canadian Mounted Police. As of June 5, 2020. The status of this case is reported as "Connecticut State Police and RCMP are actively working to determine if Helen Claire Frost is New London County Jane Doe".

Friends or associates 
It is not public knowledge whether or not Helen met with a friend or associate after she left her apartment in Prince George. Sandy thought that Helen may have been at a friend's house, but called RCMP to report Helen missing after determining that this was not the case. RCMP questioned her ex-boyfriend, Stefan Grumpner, and reported that they did not find anything about him to be suspicious. The names of associates and friends who were questioned is not public knowledge. However, Sandy and a friend discovered a tip indicating that Helen hitchhiked with a trucker. The RCMP were not able to confirm this. It is not public knowledge whether Helen met with a stranger or not after she left her apartment.

Highway of Tears 
Chronologically, Helen is the first woman to have gone missing along the Highway of Tears corridor. To raise awareness, Helen's family wanted her to be added to the RCMP E-Pana list of victims; however, this request was denied by the RCMP, stating that she didn't meet the criteria for a victim on this list. There would not be another missing or murdered woman's case along the Highway of Tears until Ginny Sampare in 1971 and then Monica Ignas in 1974. Sampare went missing from Gitsegukla, while Ignas went missing from Thornhill, British Columbia, where her remains were found.

See also
List of people who disappeared

References

External links
 Missing - Helen Claire Frost Facebook Group

1970s missing person cases
Missing person cases in Canada
Highway of Tears
Women in British Columbia
Prince George, British Columbia